Bergeron v. Bergeron, 492 So.2d 1193 (1986), is a landmark child custody case decided by the Louisiana Supreme Court. In the dispute, the Louisiana Supreme Court held that, in order to modify a custody dispute that has previously been a considered decree, the person seeking the modification bears a heavy burden of proving that the current custody is so deleterious to the child as to warrant its modification, or by clear and convincing evidence that the benefits of the change outweigh the damages that will be done to the child.

Notes

References

External links

Louisiana state case law
Trials regarding custody of children
Family law in the United States